Viktor Mykolayovych Lytvyn is a Ukrainian retired professional footballer.

Career
Viktor Lytvyn started his career in 1996 with Nerafa Slavutych (later known as Slavutych-ChAES Slavutych) where he played 23 matches. In 1998 he moved to Desna Chernihiv the main club of the city of Chernihiv. Here he played 15 matches and then in 2001 he moved to FC Nizhyn. In 2005 he moved back to Desna Chernihiv until 2008 where he played 38 matches and he won the Ukrainian Second League in the season 2005–06. Then he played 8 matches with Feniks-Illichivec (Kalinino). In 2008 he moved again back to Desna Chernihiv without playing and he has been sent to Desna-2 Chernihiv the reserve squad of the club and he played 9 matches, finishing with 7 matches for Desna Chernihiv.

Honours
Desna Chernihiv
 Ukrainian Second League: 2005–06

References

External links 
 
 

1976 births
Living people
Footballers from Chernihiv
Ukrainian footballers
FC Slavutych players
FC Desna Chernihiv players
FC Desna-2 Chernihiv players
FC Feniks-Illichovets Kalinine players
Ukrainian First League players
Ukrainian Second League players
Ukrainian Amateur Football Championship players
Association football goalkeepers